Krasnodar International Airport, also known as Pashkovsky Airport, (IATA: KRR, ICAO: URKK) is the main airport serving the southern Russian city of Krasnodar. It is an international airport, and is located 12 km east of the centre of Krasnodar city.

Krasnodar International Airport is the 9th busiest airport in Russia. In 2015, it handled more than 3.1 million passengers.

The airport is a part of Basel Aero airport managing holding. Until the end of 2012 it was the operating hub of Kuban Airlines.

Characteristics

Krasnodar International Airport has three runways that can accommodate modern aircraft, such as Boeing-737 (excluding Boeing-737-900), Boeing 757 (with limitations), Airbus A319, Airbus A320, Embraer 195, as well as helicopters of all types.

The airport's capacity is 500 passengers per hour for domestic flights and 200 passengers per hour for international flights.

In the terminal building, there are VIP and CIP lounges, as well as shops, cafes, pharmacies. Wi-Fi access is also provided.

History

In 1932, Krasnodar United Air Group was established. Later that year seven Po-2 Aerial Pest Control Agency aircraft landed near the central office of Pashkovsky state farm. In late 1932, the Agency was reorganized. It was used as a basis for the formation of Pashkovsky air base, which in late 1933 was moved to the aerodrome used by the present-day Krasnodar airport.

In 1934, the air base was reorganized into the 218 Civil Aviation Pashkovsky Special Air Group. The majority of Po-2 aircraft were re-equipped into passenger carriers. Scheduled passenger flights were performed from Krasnodar to Maikop, Sochi, Anapa, etc.

In 1941–1945, during World War II, the aircraft of the Special Air Squadron of Krasnodar Airline transported ammunition and POL to the battle-front and carried out medevac missions.

In 1946, the airport started accommodating Li-2 aircraft; and since 1948, Il-12 aircraft.

In 1960, construction of the first concrete runway was completed. Flights performed by Il-18 aircraft commenced in Krasnodar airport. Construction of a two-story passenger terminal was also completed later. Scheduled passenger and cargo flights to domestic destinations performed using Аn-10, Il-18, and Аn-12 aircraft.

In 1962, scheduled passenger service with Тu-124 aircraft was launched.

In 1964, Krasnodar United Air Group within the structure of the North Caucasian Civil Aviation Authority was formed. Later that year, the Group acquired its own fleet of Аn-24 aircraft.

In 1981, Yak-42 aircraft was put into operation. In 1984, the second concrete runway was put into operation.

In 1993, Krasnodar United Air Group within the structure of the North Caucasian Civil Aviation Authority was restructured into OJSC Kuban Airlines, which comprised an air carrier and an airport.

In 2006, OJSC Kuban Airlines was restructured through the spinoff of two of its entities, namely OJSC Krasnodar International Airport and OJSC Kuban Air Transport Territorial Agency. 20 December is the birthday of Krasnodar International Airport.

In 2007, Russian Transportation Ministry included the airport in its list of 12 international hubs on the territory of the Russian Federation.

Today, the airport is of strategic importance to Russia as its southern air gates. It is used by over 30 airlines flying to 62 destinations (including 17 international destinations).

Reconstruction 
Krasnodar International Airport is currently undergoing revamp that is divided into two parts: construction of a new 60,000 m2 airport building, scheduled to be completed in 2017, and the modernization of the aerodrome infrastructure.

The latter includes runway revamp, construction of a ramp, engineering installations and upgrade of the equipment to provide safe, uninterrupted, and high-quality aircraft handling.

Basel Aero managing the project of the new terminal building has picked up Dutch NACO, one of the world's leading independent airport consultancy and engineering firms, to develop the new airport's master plan. According to NACO, annual passenger traffic of the new terminal will reach 10 million passengers in 2030.

Within the period of design and construction of the new Krasnodar airport, the area of the existing terminal is to be expanded by 8 200 sq m. As a result, the airport's capacity will increase up to 1,700 passengers per hour. In August 2013, reconstruction of the international terminal was commenced. According to the design, the number of check-in counters will increase to 8, immigration control counters to 10, and an additional baggage carousel is to be installed. Besides, a children playground will be constructed within the terminal building.

The Krasnodar airport reconstruction project involves the domestic terminal building. The renovated terminal buildings are to be put into operation in late 2014.

Airlines and destinations

Statistics

Annual traffic

See also
List of the busiest airports in Russia
List of the busiest airports in Europe
List of the busiest airports in the former USSR

References

External links
 Krasnodar International Airport official website 
 Description of the Krasnodar airport in English

Airports in Krasnodar Krai
Buildings and structures in Krasnodar
Basel Aero